Marysville is a suburb of Fredericton, New Brunswick, Canada.

There was an Acadian village named Sainte-Marie at the site which was burned in 1758 during the Expulsion of the Acadians. Over a hundred years later the town was incorporated. 
Alexander Gibson developed the Marysville Cotton Mill. Brick duplexes were built around the mill, most of which are still standing and now privately owned. Gibson named the village after his wife and his eldest daughter, both of whom were named Mary.

In 1973 the town merged with the city of Fredericton. After the cotton mill closed in 1975, the building was renovated and converted into provincial government offices under the name Marysville Place.

Marysville was named a National Historic Site in 1993 for being one of Canada's last intact 19th-century mill towns.

See also
List of people from Fredericton
List of Neighbourhoods in New Brunswick

References

Populated places disestablished in 1973
Neighbourhoods in Fredericton
1886 establishments in New Brunswick
1973 disestablishments in New Brunswick
Former municipalities in New Brunswick
Populated places established in 1886
Acadian history
National Historic Sites in New Brunswick